Víctor Celestino Ortiz Arzú (Jutiapa, 21 May 1990) is a Honduran football player currently playing for Vida.

He's a striker but he can even plays as winger on both flanks. His main features are speed and shot from distance.

In Honduras his nickname is "La Bala Ortiz" (the bullet), for its great speed.

Club career

Club Deportivo Victoria

After some experience in youth and amateurs teams, Victor Ortiz Arzu has joined the C.D. Victoria's youth team in 2006.  After having obtained excellent results, the Club promotes him in the first team in 2007 at the age of 17. His debut in the Honduran first division takes place the following year, in 2008. The 2010 is the year of his consecration, becoming undisputed holder of the blue-white team. With the CD Victoria's team, Victor made himself known for its qualities of strength, speed and shot. Finish his experience with Club Deportivo Victoria after playing over 150 games (league and cup) and scored 42 goals in official matches, a great booty whereas he was not always used as a central striker.

F.C. Motagua

Ended his experience with C.D. Victoria and after receiving various proposals from Honduras and Costa Rica, the young talented Victor Ortiz joins with F.C. Motagua, one of the most important teams in the Central American Country. The debut with his new team takes place in the Clausura tournament 2014. His experience with F.C. Motagua was not so good. The coach preferred experiences strikers instead of Victor and he plays 16 games only (3 of them from the beginning). He concludes the tournament goalless. Victor Ortiz decides to terminate the contract with the F.C. Motagua at the end of the season because of his low coach's consideration.

International career
Ortiz played two games with the Honduras national under-20 football team at the 2009 FIFA U-20 World Cup.

References

External links
 Profile on ThePlayersAgent 
 FIFA Under 20 World Cup 2009 - South Africa - Honduras 
 FIFA Under 20 World Cup 2009 - Emirates - Honduras

1990 births
Living people
People from Colón Department (Honduras)
Association football forwards
Honduran footballers
C.D. Victoria players
F.C. Motagua players
C.D. Social Sol players
Liga Nacional de Fútbol Profesional de Honduras players